Heinrich-Hartmut Richard Gustav "Henry" Arnhold (September 15, 1921 – August 23, 2018) was an American banker and philanthropist. He was born in Dresden, the fourth child of Lisa and Heinrich Arnhold. The Arnhold family owned the bank , founded in 1864. In 1931 the bank joined with S. Bleichroeder to form Arnhold and S. Bleichroeder.

Arnhold escaped German-occupied Norway for the United States in 1941. There, during World War II, he served in that country's army intelligence as one of the Ritchie Boys. After the war he joined the family's now New York-based Arnhold and S. Bleichroeder; he became its non executive chairman in the 1970s after the death of its founder, and his uncle Hans Arnhold. In 1967 he invested in the fund created by George Soros.

Philanthropy
Arnhold endowed The New School's library (called the Arnhold Forum) and the university's Arnhold Hall. He and his wife donated some of their collection of Meissen porcelain to the Frick Collection. After his brother Rainer died he took over the leadership of the Mulago Foundation, started by Rainer. Arnhold also made significant contributions to the city of Dresden.

Family
In 1947, Arnhold married Clarisse Engel de Janosi. In addition to their son John, they had a daughter Michele (called Shelly) who died in 2007. In addition to his brother Ranier, he had three sisters, Esther, Ruth and Sigrid; Esther's son is the conservationist Peter Seligmann.

References

1921 births
2018 deaths
Businesspeople from Dresden
American bankers
German emigrants to the United States
Recipients of the Order of Merit of the Free State of Saxony
People who emigrated to escape Nazism
Ritchie Boys